Odette Kahn (1923–1982) was a leading authority on wine and editor of the La Revue du vin de France (Review of French wine) and of Cuisine et Vins de France (Food and Wines of France). She was a judge at the historic Paris Wine Tasting of 1976. Kahn was outraged at the results of the tasting, unsuccessfully demanded her ballot back, refused later to speak to organizer Steven Spurrier after the event, claimed fraud, and wrote disparagingly about the wine competition.  This event was later portrayed in the movie Bottle Shock.

Biography 
Kahn was an expert in the field of French gastronomy and wines, for which she was a well-known ambassador throughout the world.

After graduate studies in one of the best French business schools (HECJF), she became first the assistant director, and then the editor-in-chief of two  magazines, Cuisine et Vins de France and Revue du Vin de France. In 1968, after the death of Madeleine Decure, co-founder with Edmond Saillant (aka Curnonsky) of  Cuisine et Vins de France, Kahn became director of Société française d’éditions vinicoles, the publisher of  Cuisine et Vins de France and Revue du Vin de France.

She was a member of the International Academy of Wine, as well as forty wine and gastronomy fraternities throughout the world. She is the author of a cookbook published by Calmann-Lévy in 1977 under the title La Petite et la Grande Cuisine. She also collaborated in the writing of several other books, including Cuisine sans Souci (1974) and La Vraie Cuisine de l’Alsace (1976).

Until the early eighties, she was in charge of the national "Meilleur sommelier de France" competition and served as general secretary of the Association of women cooks and restaurant operators.  Kahn founded the "Amitiés Gastronomiques Internationales" association.

She participated in numerous radio and television broadcasts, and was a member of the jury in some of the most renowned gastronomic contests.  She received many awards, including the Chevalier du Mérite National, Chevalier du Mérite Agricole, and the City of Paris Medal.

Published work

See also
List of wine personalities

References

Further reading
 
 </ref>

French cuisine
Wine critics
1923 births
1982 deaths